The 1955 New Zealand Grand Prix was a motor race held at the Ardmore Circuit on 8 January 1955. It was the third iteration of the New Zealand Grand Prix and was won by Thailand's Prince Bira. Bira won in relatively dominant fashion, lapping all but two drivers – Peter Whitehead and Tony Gaze. The need for pitstops potentially cost the Ferrari pairing of Whitehead and Gaze a shot at victory. They did however complete the podium, on the lead lap.

Having both set a time of 1:33.0, Bira and Whitehead had shared the fastest lap of the race.

Classification

References

New Zealand Grand Prix
Grand Prix
January 1955 sports events in New Zealand